Pseudomonas veronii is a Gram-negative, rod-shaped, fluorescent, motile bacterium isolated from natural springs in France. It may be used for bioremediation of contaminated soils, as it has been shown to degrade a variety of simple aromatic organic compounds. Based on 16S rRNA analysis, P. veronii has been placed in the P. fluorescens group.

See Also
Pseudomonas viridiflava

References

External links
Type strain of Pseudomonas veronii at BacDive -  the Bacterial Diversity Metadatabase

Pseudomonadales
Bacteria described in 1996